The following outline is provided as an overview of and topical guide to the continent Africa:

Africa is the world's second largest and second most populous continent, after Asia. It is famous for its savanna, its jungles, and the Sahara (desert).

Geography of Africa

 Atlas of Africa
 List of cities in Africa
 List of most populous cities in Africa

Regions of Africa

Regions of Africa
 List of freshwater ecoregions in Africa and Madagascar

Directional regions 

 Central Africa
 East Africa
 North Africa
 Southern Africa
 West Africa
 United Nations geoscheme for Africa

Physiographic regions
 The Sahara Desert
 The Maghreb
 The Sahel region
 The Sudan region
 The Guinea region
 The Congo
 The Great Lakes region

Countries of Africa

List of African countries
 Coats of arms of Africa
 Flags of Africa

West Africa 

 Benin
 Burkina Faso
 Cape Verde
 The Gambia
 Ghana
 Guinea
 Guinea-Bissau
 Ivory Coast
 Liberia
 Mali
 Mauritania
 Niger
 Nigeria
 Senegal
 Sierra Leone
 Togo

North Africa 

 Algeria
 Egypt
 Libya
 Mauritania
 Morocco
 Sudan
 Tunisia
 Western Sahara

Central Africa 

 Angola
 Burundi
 Cameroon
 Central African Republic
 Chad
 Democratic Republic of the Congo
 Equatorial Guinea
 Gabon
 Republic of the Congo
 Rwanda
 São Tomé and Príncipe

East Africa 

 Burundi
 Comoros
 Djibouti
 Eritrea
 Ethiopia
 Kenya
 Madagascar
 Malawi
 Mauritius
 Mozambique
 Rwanda
 Seychelles
 Somalia
 Somaliland
 South Sudan
 Tanzania
 Uganda
 Zambia
 Zimbabwe

Southern Africa 

 Botswana
 Eswatini
 Lesotho
 Namibia
 South Africa

Dependencies

 British Indian Ocean Territory (UK)
 Mayotte (France)
 Réunion (France)
 St. Helena (UK)
 Canary Islands (Spain)
 Ceuta (Spain)
 Madeira (Portugal)
 Melilla (Spain)
 Socotra (Yemen)
 Pantelleria (Italy)
 Puntland (Somalia)
 Somaliland
 Sahrawi Arab Democratic Republic

Geographic features of Africa
 List of World Heritage Sites in Africa
 Glaciers in Africa
 Horn of Africa
 Impact craters in Africa
 Islands of Africa
 Rivers of Africa

Demography of Africa

Demographics of Africa

History of Africa

 Afrikaner nationalism
 Bantu expansion
 Berlin Conference
 Boer Republics
 Congo Free State
 Early Congolese history
 Expulsion of Asians in Uganda in 1972
 Indophobia
 Pioneer Column
 Serer ancient history
 Serer history (medieval era to present)
 South Africa under apartheid
 Timeline of Serer history
 Volkstaat

History of Africa by period

 Prehistory
 Pleistocene human population bottleneck in Africa
 Prehistoric Central North Africa
 Ancient African history
 Ancient History of South Africa
 Copper Age in Africa
 Iron Age in Africa
 Olmec alternative origin speculations
 Pre-Columbian trans-oceanic contact
 Pre-Columbian Africa-Americas contact theories
 European exploration of Africa
 Colonisation of Africa
 Blockade of Africa
 Scramble for Africa
 African theatre of World War I
 Decolonisation of Africa
 Year of Africa

History of Africa by year 
2016 in Africa
2007 in Africa
2006 in Africa
2005 in Africa
1960 in Africa (known as the "Year of Africa")

History of Africa by region
 History of Central Africa
 History of East Africa
 History of North Africa
 History of Southern Africa
 Ancient History of South Africa
 History of West Africa

History of Africa by subject

 African archaeology
 Assassinations in Africa
 Economic history of Africa
 Extinct animals of Africa
 Extinct languages of Africa
 Fascism in Africa
 Legends of Africa
 Military history of Africa
 African military systems to 1800
 African military systems (1800–1900)
 African military systems after 1900
 Natural history of Africa
 Political history of Eastern Africa
 Science and technology in Africa
 Slavery
 African slave trade
 Slavery in Africa

Empires in Africa 

African empires
 Adal Sultanate
 Ajuran Sultanate
 Almohad Caliphate
 Almoravid Caliphate
 Aro Confederacy
 Asante Union
 Ayyubid Sultanate
 Bamana Empire
 Benin Empire
 Bornu Empire
 Ethiopian Empire
 Fatimid Caliphate
 Ghana Empire
 Kaabu Empire
 Kanem Empire
 Kong Empire
 Liberian Republic
 Luba Empire
 Lunda Empire
 Mali Empire
 Mamluk Sultanate
 Marinid dynasty
 Oyo Empire
 Sennar Sultanate
 Sokoto Caliphate
 Songhai Empire
 Wassoulou Empire
 Wolof Empire

Culture of Africa

Culture of Africa
 Architecture of Africa
 Castles in Africa
 Mosques in Africa
 Tallest buildings in Africa
 Architecture of Egypt
 Ancient Egyptian architecture
 Egyptian pyramids
 Urban planning in ancient Egypt
 Egyptian Revival architecture
 Egyptian revival decorative arts
 Architect Africa Film Festival
 Architecture of Ethiopia
 Architecture of Somalia
 Art Deco in Durban
 Cape Dutch architecture
 Rondavel
 Caste system in Africa
 Etiquette in Africa
 Languages of Africa
 List of African languages
 Languages of the African Union
 Endangered languages in Africa
 Portuguese in Africa
 Writing systems of Africa
 Prostitution in Africa
 Racism in Africa
 Slavery in modern Africa
 Writing systems of Africa
 Urbanization in Africa

Art in Africa

Cinema of Africa 
 List of African films

Music of Africa 
 African popular music
 Afrobeat
Afrobeats
 Music of Africa

Cuisine of Africa

African cuisine
 Beer in Africa

People of Africa

 Chinatowns in Africa
 African diaspora
 Indigenous peoples of Africa
 List of African millionaires

Ethnic groups in Africa 

Ethnic groups in Africa
 Afrikaners
 Asians in Africa
 Asian South African
 Chinese South Africans
 Ethnic Chinese in Mozambique
 Koreans in Africa
 British diaspora in Africa
 Greeks
 Greeks in the Democratic Republic of the Congo
 Greeks in South Africa
 Greeks in Zimbabwe
 Indian diaspora in East Africa
 Indian South Africans
 Indians in Kenya
 Indians in Mozambique
 Serer people
 Tamil South Africans
 White Africans of European ancestry
 White South African
 Whites in Zimbabwe
 Whites in Kenya

Some famous individuals from Africa 

Aaron, first high-priest of children of Israel
Ahmad ibn Ibrahim al-Ghazi, Imam and General of the Adal Sultanate.
Alexander the Great, conqueror; founded Alexandria in Egypt.
Cleopatra VII, queen of Egypt.
Ellen Johnson Sirleaf, current President of Liberia, first elected black female head of state in the world.
F. W. de Klerk, winner of the Nobel Peace Prize for helping end apartheid in South Africa.
Haile Selassie I, last Emperor of Ethiopia.
Kofi Annan, diplomat from Ghana.
Léopold Sédar Senghor, poet and first president of Senegal.
Miriam, sister of Moses.
Moses, prophet who received the Ten Commandments.
Muhammad Ahmad, ("The Mahdi"), Sudanese rebel leader and messianic Islamic reformer.
Nefertiti, queen of Egypt.
Nelson Mandela, political leader in South Africa.
Ramesses II, often regarded as Ancient Egypt's greatest, most celebrated, and most powerful pharaoh.
Shaka, legendary leader of the Zulu Kingdom.
Tutankhamun, ("King Tut"), Egyptian pharaoh of the 18th dynasty.

Religion in Africa

Religion in Africa
 Traditional African religions
 Buddhism in Africa
 Christianity in Africa
 Catholic Church in Africa
 Hinduism in Africa
 Judaism in Africa
 Islam in Africa
 Serer religion

Sports in Africa

 African Games
 Africa Cup of Nations
 Ethiopian Super Cup
 FIBA Africa
 Ice hockey in Africa
 List of African records in athletics

Environment of Africa
 Natural history of Africa
 Environmental issues in Africa
 Fauna of Africa
 List of primates of Africa
 List of reptiles of Africa

Economy and infrastructure of Africa

Economy of Africa
 Agriculture
 Push–pull technology
 Banks in Africa
 Cement in Africa
 Energy in Africa
 Power stations in Africa
 Renewable energy in Africa
 Health care in Africa
 HIV/AIDS in Africa
 Hospitals in Africa
 Mineral industry of Africa
 Mining in Africa
 Metals
 Aluminum in Africa
 Copper in Africa
 Iron ore in Africa
 Platinum in Africa
 Titanium in Africa
 Uranium in Africa
 Steel in Africa
 Natural resources of Africa
 Poverty in Africa
 Late-2000s recession in Africa
 List of African stock exchanges

Communications in Africa

Communications in Africa
 Internet in Africa
 Media of Africa
 Newspapers in Africa
 Radio in Africa
 Television in Africa
 Telephone numbers in Africa

Transport in Africa

 Air transport in Africa
 Airlines of Africa
 List of largest airlines in Africa
 List of the busiest airports in Africa
 Trans-African Highway network

Education in Africa

Education in Africa
 Adult education in Africa
 Association of International Schools in Africa
 Universities in Africa
 Business schools in Africa
 Medical schools in Africa

Governments of Africa

 African Union
 African Commission on Human and Peoples' Rights

Politics of Africa

Politics of Africa
 Anarchism in Africa
 Conflicts in Africa
 Monarchies in Africa
 Political parties in Africa
 Pan-Africanism

Foreign relations of Africa

 Sino-African relations

Law of Africa

Law of Africa
 Ages of consent in Africa

See also

Africa

 African Leaders State of Africa Report
 African studies
 Continent
 Index of Africa-related articles

References

External links

News
 allAfrica.com current news, events and statistics
 BBC News In Depth - Africa 2005: Time for Change?
 Yale Economic Review Africa: Failed Economic History
History
 Africa South of the Sahara
 African Kingdoms
 BBC Story of Africa Kingdoms

Directories
 Library of Congress - African & Middle Eastern Reading Room
 
 Stanford University - Africa South of the Sahara
 The Index on Africa directory from The Norwegian Council for Africa
 Aluka - Digital library of scholarly resources from and about Africa

Politics
 Africa Action Africa Action is the oldest organization in the United States working on African affairs. It is a national organization that works for political, economic and social justice in Africa.
 Working class history in Africa—people's and grassroots histories

Sports
 Confederation of African Football; in English and French

Tourism
 

Africa
Africa